Empire of the Sun is a 1984 novel by J. G. Ballard.

Empire of the Sun may also refer to:
Empire of the Sun (film), a film adaptation of the novel
Empire of the Sun (soundtrack)
Empire of the Sun (band), an Australian electronic music duo
Empire of Japan, due to the kanji characters

See also (and not to be confused with)
Land of the Rising Sun (disambiguation)
Kingdom of the Sun (disambiguation)
The Queendom of Sol, a book series by Wil McCarthy
The empire on which the sun never sets
Sun Dynasty